The J. P. Metras Trophy is awarded annually to the most outstanding down lineman in U Sports football. The award was first initiated in 1974 and is named after John Pius Metras.

Metras was a former coach of the Western Mustangs from 1939 to 1969 and was inducted to the Canadian Football Hall of Fame in 1980.

The American equivalent to the J. P. Metras Trophy is the Lombardi Award.

List of winners

See also
Hec Crighton Trophy
Presidents' Trophy
Peter Gorman Trophy
Russ Jackson Award

References

External links
 U Sports Football Home Page

U Sports football trophies and awards